Thomas Schreiner (born February 3, 1987) is an Austrian professional basketball player for MoraBanc Andorra of the LEB Oro.

Schreiner also plays for the Austrian national team.

Professional career
After spending eight seasons in the Austrian ÖBL, Schreiner signed in 2012 with BC Andorra of the LEB Oro, Spanish second division. He promoted with the Andorran team to the top tier, the ACB League in 2014.

In the third round of the 2014–15 ACB season, Schreiner became the MVP of the week.

On July 28, 2022, he has signed with MoraBanc Andorra of the LEB Oro.

Honours

BC Andorra
LEB Oro: (1) 2014
Copa Príncipe de Asturias: (1) 2014

References

External links
 ACB profile
 FIBA Europe profile
 Spanish Basketball Federation profile

1987 births
Living people
Austrian expatriate sportspeople in Spain
Austrian men's basketball players
BC Andorra players
Bilbao Basket players
BSC Fürstenfeld Panthers players
CB Miraflores players
Expatriate basketball people in Andorra
Kapfenberg Bulls players
Liga ACB players
Point guards
People from Sankt Pölten
Sportspeople from Lower Austria
Força Lleida CE players